Silje Norendal (born 1 September 1993) is a Norwegian former snowboarder. She competes in the slopestyle and big air events. Her local club is Kongsberg IF.

She won gold in women's slopestyle in Winter X Games Europe in Tignes in 2013.

In January 2014, she won women's slopestyle in Winter X Games in Aspen, Colorado.

At the 2014 Winter Olympics in Sochi, Russia, Norendal finished in eleventh place in the Women's Slopestyle finals with a score of 49.50.

In January 2015, she won women's slopestyle for the second time in Winter X Games in Aspen, Colorado.

At the 2018 Winter Olympics in Pyeongchang, South Korea, she finished in fourth place in the women's Women's Slopestyle finals with a score of 73.91. Additionally, she finished in sixth place in the Women's Big Air finals with a score of 131.50.

On 27 July 2018, Norendal got engaged to hockey player Alexander Bonsaksen. In 2021, they had a daughter together.

References

External links
 
 
 
 
 
 

1993 births
Living people
People from Kongsberg
Norwegian female snowboarders
Snowboarders at the 2014 Winter Olympics
Snowboarders at the 2018 Winter Olympics
Olympic snowboarders of Norway
X Games athletes
Sportspeople from Viken (county)
21st-century Norwegian women